The Battle of Tiger Hill encompasses the battles fought in and around the peak of Tiger Hill between the Indian Army and Pakistan from the final week of May till second week of June 1999, during the Kargil War. The battle, with the concomitant battle for the adjoining peak of Tololing, culminated in Indian forces capturing Tiger Hill, Kargil.

Battle
Tiger Hill was held by elements of the Pakistan Army's Northern Light Infantry. In late May 1999, the 8th Battalion, Sikh Regiment (8 Sikh) had attempted an assault on Tiger Hill, but were repulsed by heavy small arms fire. Poorly coordinated further assaults initiated without adequate artillery support failed under fire from an entrenched enemy. Unable to press the attack, the soldiers dug in and surrounded the hill. 192 Mountain Brigade assumed command of the operations on Tiger Hill in late June. The 18th Battalion, The Grenadiers (18 Grenadiers), fresh from participating in the victory at Tololing, were then assigned to 192 Mountain Brigade.

The final assault on Tiger Hill began on 3 July at 17:15. 22 batteries from the Regiment of Artillery, including multi-barrelled rocket launchers, pounded enemy positions on the peak for 13 continuous hours, providing covering fire for the infantry advancing up the mountain. The 2nd Battalion, Naga Regiment (2 Naga) advanced on the right flank and 8 Sikh advanced on the left. They used unexpected, and therefore difficult, avenues of approach, maintaining the element of surprise. 200 men from Alpha and Charlie Companies of 18 Grenadiers, along with the battalion's Ghatak platoon, advanced up the rear side of the mountain, a 1,000-foot vertical cliff which the Grenadiers climbed up in 12 hours using fixed ropes, in the freezing rain. They almost made it to the top before the Pakistanis atop the peak spotted them and opened heavy fire, stalling their attack. Sensing the loss of initiative, Maj. Ravinder Singh of 8 Sikh launched a daring attack. He and a detachment of 200 soldiers climbed up the side of the adjoining Western Ridge, splitting the Pakistani defense on the night of 5 July. The group held off several counterattacks. Most of the Sikh soldiers attacked without cold weather gear, and many of the wounded died from exposure. After three more days of heavy fighting, the bold plan paid off, and 18 Grenadiers resumed the attack on the invaders from two directions. 18 Grenadiers seized the 16,700-foot (5,062 m) Tiger Hill Top on the morning of 8 July.

Gren. Yogendra Singh Yadav of 18 Grenadiers was awarded the highest military honour of Republic of India, the Param Vir Chakra, for his actions during the battle. Overall, Yadav suffered 17 bullet wounds and played a major role in capture of Tiger Hill.

References

External links
A Bloodbath foretold. The frontline.
Clinton urges India-Pakistan talks. BBC News.
 Tiger Hill – how important is it? BBC News.

Kargil War